The Copa Texeira, was a friendly football match realized between Brazil and Chile, in order to seal the peace between the two national teams, after the incident at the Estádio do Maracanã that took place during a match valid for the 1990 FIFA World Cup qualifiers.

The series were played in a two-legged format. After both matches ended 0-0, the Copa Teixeira title ended up split, with both teams receiving a copy of the trophy.

Match details

First leg

Second leg

See also
 Copa Bernardo O'Higgins

References  

Brazil national football team matches
Chile national football team matches
International association football competitions hosted by Chile
International association football competitions hosted by Brazil
Defunct international association football competitions in South America